Ducros may refer to:

People
Andy Ducros, English football player.
Anne Ducros, French jazz singer.
Françoise Ducros, Canadian politician.
Michel Ducros, French businessman.

Locations
Ducros Plantation, historic Southern sugar plantation in Terrebonne Parish, Louisiana.
Dr. Louis A. Ducros House, historic house in Saint Bernard, Louisiana.
Louis Ducros House, historic house in Clearwater, Florida.

Other
 Ducros, formerly a French distributor of spices and herbs, now a brand of McCormick & Company.